Arusam Madhusudan known as 'Mime Madhu' is an actor known for his work in Telugu films and Mime trainer. He won Ustad Bismillah Khan Sangeeth Nataka Academy Award in 2007, Nandi award for Best Actor in theater in 2002.

Early life
Madhu was born on 6 October 1977 in Hanamkonda, Warangal, Telangana to Odelu and his wife Vinodha. He done M.P.A (Master of Performing Arts) at the Sarojini Naidu School of Performing Arts, University of Hyderabad. Madhu is married to Sabrina Anastasio, classical dancer-turned-puppeteerin 2016 and They have a daughter Lalitha Rose.

Filmography

Film

Television

References

External links 
 IMDB Mime Madhu Page.

1977 births
Living people
21st-century Indian male actors
Indian male stage actors
Male actors from Telangana